Escape Me Never may refer to:

 Escape Me Never (play), a British play by Margaret Kennedy
 Escape Me Never (1935 film), a British film adaptation directed by Paul Czinner
 Escape Me Never (1947 film), an American film adaptation directed by Peter Godfrey